The Meteors are an English psychobilly band formed in 1980. Originally from London, England, they are often credited with giving the psychobilly subgenre — which fuses punk rock with rockabilly — its distinctive sound and style.

About.com calls the Meteors "the first true psychobilly band," noting their blend of the "themes of horror, punk and rockabilly". They were the second band to use the term 'Psychobilly' as a description of their music. Formed in South London in 1980, they are considered the first verifiable psychobilly band. Their albums In Heaven (1981) and Wreckin' Crew (1983) are considered landmarks of the early years of the genre. "Starting in the neo-rockabilly scene, the Meteors were initially shunned for being too different. Excuses for exclusion from rockabilly concerts varied from the band having too extreme of a sound to their drummer having green hair." The Meteors blended elements of punk rock, rockabilly, and horror film themes in their music. The Meteors articulated psychobilly's apolitical stance, a reaction to the right- and left-wing political attitudes which divided other British youth cultures. Fans of the Meteors, known as "the Crazies", are often attributed with inventing the style of slam dancing known as "wrecking", which became synonymous with the psychobilly.

Biography
The Meteors were formed in 1980 by P. Paul Fenech (guitar and vocals), Nigel Lewis (upright bass/electric bass and vocals), and Mark Robertson (drums). Fenech and Lewis had played in rockabilly bands before, but left their former band, Raw Deal, in order to experiment with a new sound that mixed horror and science fiction lyrics with a punk rock / rockabilly crossover (as distinct from the slower, psychedelic rockabilly sound of the Cramps). This sound would later be called psychobilly. What made them unique was that Fenech and Lewis each sang lead vocals on their own tracks.

The Meteors played their first show during Rockabilly Night at The Sparrow Hawk in north London, but, after being heckled due to their cross between rockabilly and punk attitudes, decided to begin playing shows beyond just rockabilly clubs. They developed a loyal following known as "the Crazies" or "Zorchmen", who invented their own dance style then called "going mental," a cross between fighting, dancing, and moshing. This would later be renamed "wrecking," and is still a staple of the psychobilly scene. This, coupled with Fenech's ritual of spitting (chicken) blood during performances, led many clubs into believing the band was dangerous and refusing to book them. The band began playing at punk rock clubs alongside UK punk bands such as The Clash, The Damned, and later Anti-Nowhere League and the UK Subs. However, unlike many punk bands, The Meteors would (and still very much do) insist that their shows be "a politics and religion free zone" in order to focus on having a good time instead of allowing disputes between fans to break out.

The band made their first TV appearance on Thames TV afternoon show White Light in late 1980. Due to their large cult following, The Meteors made a short film in late 1980 with comedian Keith Allen called Meteor Madness. It was released as a double feature with 2 Tone ska film Dance Craze in March 1981. The movie featured four songs, which made it onto the band's first vinyl single first issued on Ace Records and later on Big Beat. To date, the film Meteor Madness has never been released on video or DVD, although over the last few years poor quality copies have appeared on YouTube. The tracks were also issued as a rare 12" mini-album called The Meteors Meet Screaming Lord Sutch. Soon after that, they issued the double A-side anthems "Radioactive Kid" and "Graveyard Stomp". A session was recorded for the John Peel BBC radio show in June 1981. Again, to date, these tracks have never been officially released. In August 1981, the band were signed to Island Records and recorded their first full-length album, The Case Of The Meteors In Heaven, and 7" single, "The Crazed". The band were interviewed by No Class fanzine at The Marquee on the night of the live-recording of the track In Heaven. The original line-up also recorded an EP although, due to contract restraints, it was issued under the pseudonym of Clapham-South Escalators, which featured two vocal tracks by Lewis: "Get Me To The World On Time" and "Cardboard Cutouts"; plus one by Fenech: "Leave Me Alone". Not long after this, Mark Robertson left the band after an invitation to join Theatre Of Hate (although this never materialised). He was replaced by longtime Meteors fan/roadie Woodie. This line-up also recorded a single in early 1982 under another pseudonym; this time "The Tall Boys" was used. The single featured two vocal tracks from Lewis: "Another Half Hour Till Sunrise" and "Island Of Lost Souls". This was to be the last recording featuring Fenech and Lewis together as both Lewis and Woodie left soon after. Lewis later took part in The Escalators, The Tall Boys, The Johnson Family, and the Zorchmen.

The Meteors have gone through many line-up changes since, with Fenech being the only original member today. The current line-up includes Hendrik Corleone on bass and Wolfgang Hordemann (who, though not from the original line up, is the longest serving member by far after Fenech) on drums. They have 25 official albums, countless singles, and numerous re-issues and compilation appearances. They continue to record using their own In Heaven recording studios, based in an old church—Fenech is a fully qualified sound engineer and producer—and also Maddog Studios (a  tower in Germany), both professional studios used by many bands from around the world. The Meteors have extensively toured Japan, Europe and Scandinavia, South America, US, and Canada. They have completed well over 550 live shows (many times two or three performances per night, such as the OTMAPP Festivals).

P. Paul Fenech has also released ten solo albums and plays in many side projects including The Legendary Raw Deal (rockabilly), The Surfing Dead (instrumental), and The Murder Brothers. He is also a prolific and successful writer of horror film music and has written extensively for television and many other films (under a pseudonym). Fenech has recently contributed tracks to Sony for some upcoming PlayStation games. Nigel Lewis and Mark Robertson went on to play together in the Escalators with Woodie (drums/guitar) and Bart Coles (vocals/bass), a psychedelic rock band (although with a similar sound to Lewis' Meteors vocal tracks), and released a couple of singles and an album on the Big Beat record label. However, a serious back injury to Lewis stopped the band in their tracks. Several months later, Lewis and Robertson re-emerged as the Tall Boys, a band best known for recording the song "Take a Walk" for the Return of the Living Dead soundtrack.

P. Paul Fenech also helped the young Austrian band Sir Psyko & His Monsters by mixtaping their album "Reaperstale" as well as in recording one of the live shows in 2012 in Berlin called "Welcome to Our Hell".

Discography

Albums
 1981 In Heaven
 1983 Wreckin’ Crew  
 1984 Stampede! 
 1985 Monkey’s Breath 
 1986 Sewertime Blues  
 1987 Don't Touch the Bang Bang Fruit
 1988 Only the Meteors Are Pure Psychobilly  
 1988 The Mutant Monkey and the Surfers from Zorch
 1989 Undead, Unfriendly and Unstoppable
 1991 Madman Roll
 1992 Demonopoly
 1994 No Surrender  
 1995 Mental Instru Mentals  
 1997 Bastard Sons of a Rock’n’Roll Devil
 1999 The Meteors vs. the World
 2001 Psycho Down!
 2003 Psychobilly
 2004 These Evil Things
 2004 The Lost Album  
 2007 Hymns for the Hellbound
 2009 Hell Train Rollin'''
 2012 Doing the Lord's Work 2016 The Power of 3Singles and EPs
 1981 "The Crazed" / "Attack of the Zorch Men"
 1981 "Meteor Madness"
 1981 "Radioactive Kid"
 1981 "The Meteors Meet Screaming Lord Sutch"
 1982 "Mutant Rock"
 1983 "Johnny Remember Me"
 1984 "I'm Just a Dog"
 1985 "Hogs & Cuties"
 1985 "Fire, Fire"
 1985 "Stampede"
 1985 "Bad Moon Rising"
 1986 "Surf City"
 1986 "Archive4"
 1987 "Don't Touch the Bang Bang Fruit"
 1987 "Go Buddy Go"
 1988 "Somebody Put Something in My Drink"
 1988 "Rawhide" / "Surfin' on the Planet Zorch" 
 1988 "Please Don't Touch"
 1991 "Encores"
 1991 "Chainsaw Boogie"
 1992 "Who Do You Love"
 1994 "Hell Ain't Hot Enough for Me"
 1994 "The Meteors"
 1997 "Slow Down You Grave Robbing Bastard"
 2005 "25th Anniversary"
 2007 "Disneyland" / "Surf City"
 2009 "Psychobilly Number One"
 2012 "The Psychomania Syndrome (Welcome)"
 2016 "Psycho (Wrecked Forever)"

Live albums
 1983 The Meteors Live 1986 Live II 1987 Live and Loud!! 1987 Night of the Werewolf  
 1990 Live Styles of the Sick and Shameless (Live III) 1991 Encores 1992 Live 4 ... International Wreckers  
 1996 Welcome to the Wreckin’ Pit 1996 International Wreckers 2 (The Lost Tapes of Zorch) 
 1999 Psychobilly Revolution  
 2002 The Final Conflict 2003 From Beyond (recording from a 1981 gig, to date the only official 'live' recording of the original line-up)
 2004 Hell in the Pacific  
 2012 Maniac Rockers from Hell 2020 Best of Life (vinyl)

Compilations
 1985 The Curse of the Mutants  
 1986 Teenagers from Outer Space (all the tracks of the original line-up including a few rare unreleased tracks)
 1987 Don't Touch the Bang Bang Fruit  
 1989 Stampede & Monkey's Breath 1989 Undead, Unfriendly and Unstoppable Plus the Mutant Monkey and the Surfers from Zorch 1991 Bad Moon Rising 1991 The Meteors Live & the Meteors Live II 1993 The Best Of 1995 Corpse Grinder (The Best Of) 1995 Graveyard Stomp, the Best of the Meteors 1981–1988 1995 Sewertime Blues / Don't Touch the Bang Bang Fruit 1995 Live, Leary and Fucking Loud! 1996 John Peel Sessions (1983–1985) 1997 From Zorch with Love: The Very Best of the Meteors 1981–1987 2001 Anagram Singles Collection 2002 Wreckin' Live 2005 Meteor Club – The Best Of 2011 Kings of Psychobilly 2012 30th Anniversary Box 2013 Psychobilly Rules! The Collection''

References

British psychobilly musical groups
Musical groups established in 1980
Musical groups from London